Lieutenant General Bennet S. Sacolick, is a retired general officer in the United States Army, former commander of Delta Force and John F. Kennedy Special Warfare Center and School. He has participated in numerous combat operations, such as; Operation Just Cause in 1989, Operation Desert Storm in 1991, Operation Gothic Serpent in 1993 and since 2001 the wars in Iraq and Afghanistan.

Military career
Sacolick enlisted in the United States Army in 1981 and was assigned to 2nd Ranger Battalion, 75th Ranger Regiment prior to attending Officer Candidate School. Sacolick earned his commission as an Infantry officer in 1982 and was assigned Rifle platoon leader to the 509th Airborne Battalion Combat Team in Vicenza, Italy. In 1986, after completing the Special Forces Qualification Course, he was assigned to 3rd Battalion, 7th Special Forces Group and participated in combat operations in El Salvador, Peru, Colombia and Panama during Operation Just Cause. In 1990 Sacolick volunteered for and completed a specialized selection course for assignment to 1st Special Forces Operational Detachment - Delta (1st SFOD-D), commonly known to the public as "Delta Force", at Fort Bragg, North Carolina. Sacolick completed Operator training course and served as Assistant Operations Officer then Troop Commander and participated in numerous combat operations during Operation Desert Storm in Iraq, Operation Gothic Serpent in Somalia and Operation Joint Endeavor in Bosnia. Sacolick subsequently served as Deputy Operations Officer, Squadron Commander and later on unit commander from April 2003 to July 2005. His military education includes Infantry Officer Basic Course, Infantry Advanced Course, Special Forces Qualification Course, Defense Language Institute (Spanish) and United States Army Command and General Staff College. From 2005 to 2008, Sacolick served as Deputy Director for Defense, Counter Terrorism Center - Central Intelligence Agency in Washington D.C. providing liaison and support for the CIA  counterterrorism mission and served as the subject matter expert for US Special Operations. Later on Sacolick assumed command of the U.S. Army John F. Kennedy Special Warfare Center and School in August 2010. From 2012 to 2014, Sacolick was assigned as Director of Force Management and Development for the U.S. Special Operations Command at MacDill Air Force Base. He retired in 2016.

Awards and decorations

References

United States Army generals
Living people
Year of birth missing (living people)